"GPS" is a song recorded by Colombian singer Maluma featuring Moroccan-American rapper French Montana. It was one of the three promotional singles featured in the short film X, and was released on 24 November 2017, alongside "Vitamina" and "23" as a promotional single from Maluma's third studio album F.A.M.E. (2018). The three promotional singles however, were not included in the final version of the album due to unknown reasons. It was written by Maluma, French Montana, Andrés Uribe, Kevin Mauricio Jiménez Londoño, Byran Snaider Lezcano, Stiven Rojas, Mario Cáceres and Servando Primera, and was produced by Rude Boyz. The promotional single has peaked at number 35 on the Billboard Hot Latin Songs chart and at number 84 on the Spanish PROMUSICAE songs chart.

Track listing

Charts

Certifications

Release history

References

External links

2017 songs
2017 singles
Maluma songs
French Montana songs
Songs written by French Montana
Spanish-language songs
Spanglish songs
Macaronic songs
Latin pop songs
Sony Music Latin singles
Sony Music Colombia singles
Songs written by Maluma (singer)